One for All is a 1999 album by Kazumi Watanabe. It was recorded live in New York, at the Bottom Line, on 31 March 1999 between 7:30 PM and 9:30 PM, according to the album's booklet. It features many famous musicians from all over the world such as Akiko Yano, John Patitucci and Larry Coryell.

Track listing
All songs arranged by Watanabe and Tanikawa, except tracks 2 (Yano) and 4 (Mainieri).

 "Havana" (Koko Tanikawa)
 "Water Ways Flow Backward Again" (Akiko Yano)
 "Libertango" (Ástor Piazzolla)
 "Somewhere" (Leonard Bernstein)
 "Afro Blue" (Mongo Santamaria)
 "One for All" (Watanabe)
 "Milestones" (Miles Davis)

Personnel
Kazumi Watanabe - guitars
Mike Mainieri - vibraphone
John Patitucci - bass
Larry Coryell - guitar
Akiko Yano - piano
Mino Cinelu - drums

Additional personnel
Doug Epstein - recording, mixing
Billy Eric, Tom Filogomo - engineer assistants
Greg Calbi - mastering
Toshifumi Kusano - photography
Yutaka Katayama - artwork director
Hiromi Saeki - coordination
Kazuhiko Koike - executive producer
Mixed at The Warehouse Recording Studio, mastered at Sterling Sound

Kazumi Watanabe albums
1999 live albums
Albums recorded at the Bottom Line